Dobropolye is a rural locality (a settlement) in Grayvoronsky District, Belgorod Oblast, Russia. The population was 52 as of 2010. There is 1 street.

Geography 
Dobropolye is located 25 km southeast of Grayvoron (the district's administrative centre) by road. Novostroyevka-Vtoraya is the nearest rural locality.

References 

Rural localities in Grayvoronsky District